Tom Hearst is an American racing driver from Muscatine, Iowa who won the first NASCAR Advance Auto Parts Weekly Series national championship in 1982.

Driving a dirt Late Model for owners Keith Simmons and Gary Oliver, Hearst won 27 of the 50 NASCAR-sanctioned races that he entered.  Most were at race tracks in Davenport, Iowa; Cedar Rapids, Iowa; West Liberty, Iowa; and Freeport, Illinois.  Hearst also won 15 of the 17 non-NASCAR races in which he competed.

He made an attempt in the NASCAR Southwest Series, in 1987, but failed to qualify.

References

External links
 

NASCAR drivers
Racing drivers from Iowa
Living people
People from Muscatine, Iowa
Year of birth missing (living people)